Alain Lequeux (1947 – 26 April 2006) was one of France's leading jockeys in the 1970s and 1980s. He won 33 Group or Grade 1 races, including the 1981 Washington, D.C. International Stakes aboard Providential for trainer Charlie Whittingham. Son of leading French rider Guy Lequeux, he won more than 2,000 races while riding in France from 1963 to 1992. He won the 1974 Poule d'Essai des Pouliches (Fr-G1) (French One Thousand Guineas) with Dumka, and the 1979 St. Leger Stakes (Eng-G1) with Son of Love (Fr).

A noted gourmet, following his retirement from racing the popular and personable Lequeux owned and operated the Cafe Lequeux in Chantilly not far from the Chantilly Racecourse.

He died in hospital at Senlis, Oise on 26 April 2006 of a cerebral hemorrhage at age 59.

References

1947 births
2006 deaths
French jockeys